Raskatov is a Russian masculine surname, its feminine counterpart is Raskatova. Notable people with the surname include:

Alexander Raskatov (born 1953), Russian composer
Volodymyr Raskatov (1957–2014), Ukrainian swimmer 

Russian-language surnames